Yeh Ballet is a Netflix Original Film written and directed by Sooni Taraporevala and produced by Siddharth Roy Kapur. The film features two newcomers—Achintya Bose as Amiruddin Shah, and Manish Chauhan portraying Nishu (character based on his own life), as the leads. The film also stars Julian Sands, Jim Sarbh, Danish Husain, Vijay Maurya, Heeba Shah, and Kalyanee Mulay. The film is streaming now on Netflix. The film is a fictionalized version of a short documentary by Taraporevala by the same name.

Plot
Discovered by an eccentric ballet master, two gifted but underprivileged Mumbai teens face bigotry and disapproval as they pursue their dancing dreams.

Cast
Julian Sands as Saul Aron
Achintya Bose as Asif
Manish Chauhan as Nishu
Jim Sarbh as Academy Head
Danish Husain as Asif's father
Vijay Maurya as Nishu's father
Heeba Shah as Asif's mother
Kalyanee Mulay Nishu's mother
Sasha Shetty as Nina
Purva Barve as Nishu's sister
Mekhola Bose as Asha
Mikhail Yawalkar as Arjun
Nizamuddin Shah as Asif's brother
Sarah-Jane Dias as show judge (Special appearance)
Boman Irani as show judge (Special appearance)
Rahul Khanna as show judge (Special appearance)

Release
Yeh Ballet was released on Netflix on 21 February 2020.

References

External links
 
 

2020 films
2020s Hindi-language films
Hindi-language Netflix original films
Indian direct-to-video films
2020 direct-to-video films